Charles Freeman Sandham (12 October 1781 – 14 February 1869) was a British Army officer who fought during the Napoleonic Wars and commanded a Brigade of Artillery at the Battle of Waterloo on 18June 1815.

Biography
After service in Holland in 1799 he was part of the 1807 Copenhagen Expedition. Present at four engagements during the Walcheren Campaign, he subsequently served under Sir John Moore during the 1809 retreat from Corunna. Sandham campaigned in Holland, Flanders and France during 1814 before commanding a Brigade of the Royal Artillery at the Battle of Waterloo on 18June 1815. During the battle, his Brigade were armed with five 9-pounder cannons and one 5 1/2" howitzer. Sources claim that "the first shot fired by the allied artillery at Waterloo was fired by Sandham's brigade."

In 1833 he was appointed Deputy Lieutenant of Sussex.

After his death he was buried in the churchyard of St. Marys in Washington, Sussex.

References

Bibliography 

1781 births
1869 deaths
British Army personnel of the Napoleonic Wars
Royal Artillery officers
People from Washington, West Sussex